First Presbyterian Church of Whitefish is a historic Presbyterian church at 301 Central Avenue in Whitefish, Montana.

It was built in 1921 and added to the National Register of Historic Places in 2004.

It was deemed significant for its associations with the social history of Whitefish and from its Romanesque Revival architecture, "a fine representation of work by regional architects Rigg and Vantyne."

References

Presbyterian churches in Montana
Churches on the National Register of Historic Places in Montana
Romanesque Revival architecture in Montana
Romanesque Revival church buildings in the United States
Churches completed in 1921
Whitefish, Montana
National Register of Historic Places in Flathead County, Montana
1921 establishments in Montana